Nothing Left at All is the first commercial EP of the Irish band The Cranberry Saw Us. It was released by Xeric Records in cassette format. Xeric Records made 300 copies and they sold out at local stores within a few days. This is the band’s last album to be released under their original name. The song "Shine Down" appears only on this tape. It was later known as "Take My Soul Away", but was never re-recorded.

Track listing

 "Nothing Left at All" (3:51)
 "Pathetic Senses" (3:35)
 "Shine Down" (4:13)

Personnel
The Cranberry Saw Us
Dolores O'Riordan – lead vocals, keyboards
Noel Hogan – guitar
Mike Hogan – bass guitar
Fergal Lawler – drums

References

1990 EPs
The Cranberries albums